Cruach nan Capull is a mountain within the Arrochar Alps, near Loch Fyne, in Argyll and Bute, Scotland. It stands on the southern side of Hell's Glen and rises to a height of 611 m (2005 ft).

References

 http://www.go4awalk.com/mountains/scottishmtns.php?mtn=21267
 https://www.geograph.org.uk/photo/851559
 

Mountains and hills of Argyll and Bute
Grahams
Marilyns of Scotland
Mountains and hills of the Southern Highlands